Wangolepis sinensis is a nomen nudum referring to as yet formally undescribed, primarily Early Silurian-aged Chinese and Vietnamese fossils of what are agreed to be of a primitive placoderm.

References

Placoderms of Asia
Nomina nuda